Michael, Mickey or Mike Graham may refer to:

Sportsmen
 Mike Graham (American football) (1923–2003), American football player for Cincinnati and Los Angeles
 Michael Graham (basketball) (born 1963), American basketball player
 Michael Graham (footballer) (born 1952), Australian rules footballer
 Mike Graham (footballer) (born 1959), English footballer who played for Bolton Wanderers and Swindon Town
 Mickey Graham (born 1975), Irish Gaelic footballer and manager
 Mike Graham (wrestler) (1951–2012), American professional wrestler
 Shayne Graham (Michael Shayne Graham, born 1977), American football player
 Todd Graham (Michael Todd Graham, born 1964), American football coach

Others
 Michael Graham (scientist), scientist, author and conservationist
 Michael Graham (director) (born 1982), American director
 Michael Graham (radio personality), American talk radio host and columnist
 Michael Graham (singer) (born 1972), Irish singer, member of Boyzone
 Michael J. Graham, American Jesuit and educator
 Mike Graham (journalist) (born 1960), British journalist and presenter for Talkradio
 Michael Graham (Neighbours), a fictional character in the Australian soap opera Neighbours

See also
 
 Graham (surname)